Henry Josiah Griswold (1837–1929), born in Madison, Connecticut, had a significant role in modifying circular knitting machines. Because of Henry Josiah Griswold, in England, the word "Griswold" became synonymous with domestic circular knitting machines. He founded a hosiery company in 1891 with the name "London and Leicester Hosiery Company" and also leased a factory on Winifred Street in Leicester. Griswold returned to America between 1890 and 1892 and sold his rights to the firm to I. L. Berridge.

Patents 
After Henry Josiah Griswold's 1872 sock machine, fewer framework knitters were needed.

Henry Josiah Griswold received a patent [number 3257] in 1873 for "Improvements in Knitting Machinery," and another patent [number 5048] in 1880 for "Improvements in the stocking manufacturing machines and other knitted fabrics".

Improvements in knitting machines 
Henry changed the way that the knitting machines worked so that they were easier to use and made better products. Henry Griswold improved latch-needle knitting by moving the needles individually and directly by bending their shanks. He did this in 1878 with his hand-operated, revolving cam-box, small-diameter sock machine.

See also 

 History of knitting
 Walter Golaski
 Knitting needle
 William Lee (inventor)

References 

Knitting tools and materials
Knitting
People in knitting
History of the textile industry